is a Japanese footballer currently playing as a midfielder for Kagoshima United.

Career statistics

Club
.

Notes

References

External links

1997 births
Living people
Japanese footballers
Association football midfielders
Regionalliga players
J2 League players
Fortuna Düsseldorf players
Tochigi SC players
Kagoshima United FC players
Suzuka Point Getters players
Association football people from Okayama Prefecture